Cellophane noodles, or fensi, sometimes called glass noodles, are a type of transparent noodle made from starch (such as mung bean starch, potato starch, sweet potato starch, tapioca, or canna starch) and water. A stabilizer such as chitosan (or alum, illegal in some jurisdictions) may also be used.

They are generally sold in dried form, soaked to reconstitute, then used in soups, stir-fried dishes, or spring rolls. They are called "cellophane noodles" or "glass noodles" because of their cellophane- or glass-like transparency when cooked.
Cellophane noodles should not be confused with rice vermicelli, which are made from rice and are white in color rather than clear (after cooking in water).

Varieties 
Cellophane noodles are made from a variety of starches. In China, cellophane noodles are usually made of mung bean starch or sweet potato starch. Chinese varieties made from mung bean starch are called Chinese vermicelli, bean threads, or bean thread noodles. Chinese varieties made from sweet potato starch are called Fentiao or Hongshufen. Thicker Korean varieties made with sweet potato starch are called sweet potato noodles or dangmyeon.

Cellophane noodles are available in various thicknesses. Wide, flat cellophane noodle sheets called mung bean sheets are also produced in China. In Korea, napjak-dangmyeon (literally "flat dangmyeon") refers to flat sweet potato noodles.

Production 
In China, the primary site of production of cellophane noodles is the town of Zhangxing, in Zhaoyuan, Shandong province. However, historically the noodles were shipped through the port of Longkou, and thus the noodles are known and marketed as Longkou fensi.

Use

East Asia

China 

They are also marketed under the name saifun, the Cantonese pronunciation of the Mandarin xìfěn (literally "slender noodle"), though the name fánsī (粉絲) is the term most often used in Cantonese.

In China, cellophane noodles are a popular ingredient used in stir fries, soups, and particularly hot pots. They can also be used as an ingredient in fillings for a variety of Chinese jiaozi (dumplings) and bing (flatbreads), especially in vegetarian versions of these dishes. Thicker cellophane noodles are also commonly used to imitate the appearance and texture of shark's fin in vegetarian soups. Thicker varieties, most popular in China's northeast, are used in stir fries as well as cold salad-like dishes. A popular shanghai cuisine using the ingredient is fried tofu with thin noodles (Pinyin: yóu dòu fu-xiàn fěn tāng). A popular Sichuan dish called ants climbing a tree consists of stewed cellophane noodles with a spicy ground pork meat sauce.

In Tibetan cuisine of Tibet Autonomous Region, glass noodles are called phing or fing and are used in soup, pork curry or with mushrooms.

Japan 
In Japanese cuisine, they are called harusame, literally "spring rain". Unlike Chinese glass noodles, they are usually made from potato starch. They are commonly used to make salads, or as an ingredient in hot pot dishes. They are also often used to make Japanese adaptations of Chinese and Korean dishes. Shirataki noodles are translucent, traditional Japanese noodles made from the konjac yam and sometimes tofu.

Korea 

In Korean cuisine, glass noodles are usually made from sweet potato starch and are called dangmyeon (literally "Tang noodles"; also spelled dang myun, dangmyun, tang myun, or tangmyun).  They are commonly stir-fried in sesame oil with beef and vegetables, and flavoured with soy and sugar, in a popular dish called japchae (hangul: 잡채). They are usually thick, and are a brownish-gray color when in their uncooked form.

South Asia

India 
In India, glass noodles are called falooda (see falooda, the dessert dish), and are served on top of kulfi (a traditional ice cream). They are usually made from arrowroot starch using a traditional technique. The noodles are flavorless so they provide a nice contrast with the sweet kulfi. Kulfi and falooda can be bought from numerous food stalls throughout northern and southern parts of India.

Southeast Asia

Indonesia 
Its usually eaten with bakso, tekwan, and soto. In Klaten, soun made from aren starch.

Malaysia 

Myanmar (Burma) 
In Myanmar, cellophane noodles are called kyazan, more specifically called pe kyazan, which is typically made with mung bean flour. The other form of kyazan, called hsan kyazan, refers to rice vermicelli.

Kyazan is the primary starch used in a Burmese consomme called kya zan hinga, and is also used in Burmese salads.

Philippines 

In Filipino cuisine, the noodles are called a similar name: sotanghon because of the popular dish of the same name made from them using chicken and wood ears. They are also confused with rice vermicelli, which is called bihon in the Philippines.

Thailand 

In Thai cuisine, glass noodles are called wun sen. They are commonly mixed with pork and shrimp in a spicy salad called yam wun sen, or stir-fried as phat wun sen.

Vietnam 
In Vietnamese cuisine, there are two varieties of cellophane noodles. The first, called bún tàu or bún tào, are made from mung bean starch, and were introduced by Chinese immigrants. The second, called miến or miến dong, are made from canna, and were developed in Vietnam. These cellophane noodles are a main ingredient in the dishes: miến gà, miến lươn, miến măng vịt, and miến cua. These cellophane noodles are sometimes confused with rice vermicelli (Vietnamese: bún) and arrowroot starch noodles (Vietnamese: arrowroot: củ dong, arrowroot starch: bột dong/bột hoàng tinh/bột mì tinh).

Polynesia

French Polynesia 
In French Polynesia, cellophane noodles are known as vermicelle de soja and was introduced to the islands by Hakka agricultural workers during the 19th-century. They are most often used in maa tinito, a dish made with cellophane noodles mixed together with pork, beans and cooked vegetables.

Hawaii 
In Hawaii, where cuisine is heavily influenced by Asian cultures, cellophane noodles are known locally as long rice, supposedly because the process of making the noodles involves extruding the starch through a potato ricer.  They are used most often in chicken long rice, a dish of cellophane noodles in chicken broth that is often served at luaus.

Samoa 
Glass noodles were introduced to Samoa by Cantonese agricultural workers in the early 1900s where they became known as "lialia", a Samoan word meaning "to twirl", after the method of twirling the noodles around chopsticks when eating. A popular dish called sapasui (transliteration of the Cantonese chop suey) is common fare at social gatherings. Sapasui, a soupy dish of boiled glass noodles mixed with braised pork, beef, or chicken and chopped vegetables, is akin to Hawaiian "long rice".

Health concerns
In 2004, a number of companies producing Longkou cellophane noodles produced in Yantai, Shandong were discovered to be adulterated, with unscrupulous companies making noodles from cornstarch instead of green beans in order to reduce costs; the companies, to make the cornstarch transparent, were adding sodium formaldehyde sulfoxylate and lead-based whiteners to their noodles. 

In December 2010, Czech food inspection authorities (SZPI) again inspected Chinese cellophane noodles, this time determining that  of aluminium had been used in the production of the noodles. Above  is an illegal amount for noodles in Czech and EU markets (see Annex I to Regulation (EC) No 669/2009 and its amendments (EU) No 187/2011, 618/2013 annex I).

See also 

 List of noodles
 Hiyamugi
 Kelp noodles
 Khanom chin

References

External links 

Cook's Thesaurus: Other Asian Noodles

Chinese noodles
Korean noodles
Noodles
Philippine noodles
Vietnamese noodles
Japanese noodles
Hawaiian cuisine
Samoan cuisine
French Polynesian cuisine
Polynesian Chinese cuisine